This is a list of Canadian films which were released in 2005.

See also
 2005 in Canada
 2005 in Canadian television

References

External links
Feature Films Released In 2005 With Country of Origin Canada at IMDb
Canada's Top Ten for 2005 (list of top ten Canadian feature films, selected in a process administered by TIFF)
 List of 2005 box office number-one films in Canada

2005
2005 in Canadian cinema
Canada